Light utility vehicle or LUV may refer to:
 Light-weight utility vehicle
 All-terrain vehicle
 Chevrolet LUV
 Military light utility vehicle